Apoptosis facilitator Bcl-2-like protein 14 is a protein that in humans is encoded by the BCL2L14 gene.

The protein encoded by this gene belongs to the BCL2 protein family. BCL2 family members form hetero- or homodimers and act as anti- or pro-apoptotic regulators that are involved in a wide variety of cellular activities. Overexpression of this gene has been shown to induce apoptosis in cells. Four alternatively spliced transcript variants, which encode three distinct isoforms, have been reported for this gene.

References

External links

Further reading